Zaoksky District  is an administrative district (raion), one of the twenty-three in Tula Oblast, Russia. As a municipal division, it is incorporated as Zaoksky Municipal District. It is located in the north of the oblast. Its administrative center is the urban locality (a work settlement) of Zaoksky. Population: 22,368 (2010 Census);  The population of the administrative center accounts for 31.8% of the district's total population.

See also
 Temyan

References

Notes

Sources

Districts of Tula Oblast